National Museum of Fine Arts may refer to:

National Museum of Fine Arts (Albania)
Museo Nacional de Bellas Artes (Buenos Aires), Argentina
Museu Nacional de Belas Artes in Brazil
Chilean National Museum of Fine Arts in Chile
Museo Nacional de Bellas Artes de La Habana, Cuba
National Museum of Fine Arts, Malta
National Museum of Fine Arts (Manila) in the Philippines
Nationalmuseum in Sweden
National Taiwan Museum of Fine Arts
Vietnam National Museum of Fine Arts